Stigmella samiatella is a moth of the family Nepticulidae. It is found throughout Europe and south-western Asia. It has recently been recorded from Georgia and Russia.

The wingspan is 5–7 mm. Adults are on wing from April to September and in October in southern Europe. In Britain it is believed to be (partly) univoltine, but in the Netherlands and Sweden it is clearly bivoltine.

The larvae feed on Castanea sativa, Quercus castaneifolia, Quercus cerris, Quercus frainetto, Quercus pedunculiflora, Quercus petraea, Quercus pubescens and Quercus robur. They mine the leaves of their host plant. The mine consists of a fairly long, rather slender corridor. The frass is concentrated in a broad, often interrupted central band.

External links
 Fauna Europaea
 bladmineerders.nl
 The Quercus Feeding Stigmella Species Of The West Palaearctic: New Species, Key And Distribution (Lepidoptera: Nepticulidae)
 UKmoths
 
 

Nepticulidae
Moths described in 1839
Moths of Asia
Moths of Europe
Taxa named by Philipp Christoph Zeller